Jocelyn Denise Moorhouse (born 4 September 1960) is an Australian screenwriter and film director. She has directed films such as Proof, How to Make an American Quilt, A Thousand Acres and The Dressmaker.

Moorhouse has also collaborated with her husband, film director P. J. Hogan on films such as Muriel's Wedding (1994) and Mental (2012).

Early life 
Moorhouse was born in Melbourne, Victoria.

Moorhouse did her HSC year in 1978 at Vermont High School where her mother taught art, which is the same high school that Gillian Armstrong attended a few years earlier. She then enrolled in the Australian Film, Television and Radio School (AFTRS).

Career 
It was while studying at AFTRS that Moorhouse completed her first short film entitled Pavane in 1983. She graduated from AFTRS in 1984 and started work as television script editor.

She created a 12-part series called c/o The Bartons for ABC Television in 1988, which was based on one of her short films at AFTRS called The Siege of the Bartons' Bathroom. Some of the other television shows she worked on included The Flying Doctors, Out of the Blue, A Place to Call Home, and The Humpty Dumpty Man.

Moorhouse made her feature film debut in 1991 with Proof. The idea for the film came from her interest in blindness and photography. She initially intended it to be a short film, but not being able to secure the funding for a short, she decided to make it into a feature film instead. It took five years to go into production, but when it did it had a budget of $1.1 million. The film ended up taking six weeks to shoot in Melbourne during the winter of 1990.

The success of Proof brought Moorhouse bigger and better opportunities. She followed up with her first "Hollywood blockbuster" with How to Make an American Quilt in 1995. Anne Bancroft, Winona Ryder, Kate Nelligan, Dermot Mulroney, and Alfre Woodard all had roles in the film, which was met with mixed reviews.

Her next feature film was A Thousand Acres in 1997, an adaptation of the Pulitzer Prize-winning novel by Jane Smiley. The film is about the relationship between a father and three daughters when tragedy is introduced into their lives. It starred Jessica Lange, Michelle Pfeiffer, Jennifer Jason Leigh, and Jason Robards and was also met with mixed reviews. In 1999 both Hogan and Moorhouse through the Hogan Moorhouse Pictures company signed deal with Sony.

In 2012, Moorhouse directed the play Sex with Strangers for the Sydney Theatre Company, which was well reviewed by online magazine Crikey.

The Dressmaker (2015) stars Kate Winslet, Judy Davis, Liam Hemsworth, and Hugo Weaving. The film was based on the novel by Rosalie Ham and is about a dressmaker who returns to her home in Australia to take care of her ailing, mentally unstable mother.

Moorhouse directed Troppo, an eight-part television crime drama series set in North Queensland, for ABC Television in 2021. The series debuted in February 2022.

Collaborations

Moorhouse was producer of her husband's films Muriel's Wedding in 1994 and Mental in 2012, and was screenwriter for his 2002 film Unconditional Love.

Personal life 
Moorhouse is married to film director P. J. Hogan. They have four children, two of whom are autistic.

In April 2019, Moorhouse spoke on the ABC Television program Australian Story about how their relationship had developed and how having the children had affected their personal and professional lives, including a move back to Australia from the US.

Her memoir, in which Moorhouse writes about her career as well as her personal and family life, Unconditional Love: A Memoir of Filmmaking and Motherhood, was published in April 2019.

Awards 

Moorhouse's first feature film, Proof, earned instant critical acclaim in Australia winning six Australian Film Institute Awards, including best screenplay and best director. Proof also won multiple prizes at various international film festivals. These include the Silver Hugo award in Chicago, the Golden Camera-Special Mention Award in Cannes, the 2nd place audience award at Mill Valley, the Bronze Award in Tokyo, and the Critics Award in São Paulo. Proof also earned Moorhouse the Sutherland Trophy at the British Film Institute Awards in 1992.
Moorhouse also won an Australian Film Institute Award for best film for Muriel's Wedding.

Filmography

Books

Unconditional Love: A Memoir of Filmmaking and Motherhood (2019)

References

External links

Film directors from Melbourne
Australian women film directors
1960 births
Living people
English-language film directors